The Leidart was an automobile manufactured by Leidart Cars Ltd in Pontefact, Yorkshire between 1936 and 1938. The name was a combination of the cars creators, Leith and Huddart, and was typical of the Anglo-American hybrids that were being manufactured in the United Kingdom at this time. The Leidart used a Ford V8 engine in an English chassis, with a combination of 2-seater and 4-seater open bodies.

Production was minimal, and may have only been the prototype, which featured extensively in press announcements of the time.

References

External links
Photo

Vintage vehicles
Defunct motor vehicle manufacturers of England
Defunct companies based in Yorkshire